Weyman Airpark  is an airport in New Brunswick, Canada located near the Keswick River in Sisson Settlement.

References

Registered aerodromes in New Brunswick
Transport in York County, New Brunswick
Buildings and structures in York County, New Brunswick